Paolo Montorsi (born 14 August 1951) is an Italian volleyball player. He competed in the men's tournament at the 1976 Summer Olympics.

References

1951 births
Living people
Italian men's volleyball players
Olympic volleyball players of Italy
Volleyball players at the 1976 Summer Olympics
Sportspeople from Modena